Yamas (Yehidat HaMista'arvim) is a SWAT tier 1 tasked with black operation, clandestine operation, counterterrorism, covert operation, hostage rescue, irregular warfare operation, serving high-risk arrest and search warrants, special operations, special reconnaissance, and VIP protection attached to the Israeli Border Police, but directly subordinate to Shin Bet. A secret unit, known for its undercover counterterrorism operations conducted in civilian Arab disguise within Arab territories. Its basic purpose is to deal with disturbances, demonstrations and neutralize the agitating factors, as well as to make harsh arrests in the heart of a hostile Arab population. Its uniqueness is the activity that takes place when the unit's fighters are disguised as Arabs. Its personnel do not wear uniforms and are not allowed to disclose their membership of the organization. The unit's sniper teams are considered to be amongst the best in Israel, having won numerous sniper awards.

See also
 Shin Bet
 Israel Border Police
 Israeli special forces units
 Yamam
 Mista'arvim

References

 Deflem, Mathieu. 2012. "Yehida Mishtartit Mistaravim (YAMAS) (Israel)." pp. 71–72 in Counterterrorism: From the Cold War to the War on Terror, Vol. 2, edited by Frank G. Shanty. Santa Barbara, CA: Praeger/ABC-CLIO.

Israel Border Police
Special forces of Israel